A curricle was a smart, light, two-wheeled chaise or "chariot", large enough for the driver and a passenger and—most unusually for a vehicle with a single axle—usually drawn by a carefully matched pair of horses. It was popular in the early 19th century; its name—from the Latin curriculum, meaning "running", "racecourse" or "chariot"—is the equivalent of a  "runabout", and it was a rig suitable for a smart young man who liked to drive himself, at a canter. The French adopted the English-sounding term  for such vehicles. The lightweight swept body with just the lightest dashboard hung with a pair of lamps was hung from a pair of outsized swan-neck leaf springs at the rear. For a grand show in the Bois de Boulogne or along the seafront at Honfleur, two liveried mounted grooms might follow.

In Northanger Abbey (published in 1817) Henry Tilney drives a curricle; John Thorpe drives a gig, but buffoonishly praises it as "curricle-hung". Margaret Sullivan found Jane Austen's assignment of vehicles to the two men far from arbitrary.

Curricles were notorious for the accidents their drivers suffered. Thus, in the 1999 Regency romance novel Miss Carlyle's Curricle by Karen Harbaugh,
the heroine inherits the curricle in which her uncle died in a racing accident.
The danger involved led to cheaper and safer  phaetons and  cabriolets replacing curricles.

See also 
 Types of carriages

References

External links
Gigs, Cabriolets and Curricles. Jane Austen Centre Bath UK England.

Carts
Carriages

sv:Karriol